is a Japanese politician who was the president of the House of Councillors of Japan from 2019 to 2022. A member of the Liberal Democratic Party, she was previously the vice president of the House of Councillors from 2007 to 2010.

Background and career
A native of Tokyo and graduate of Bunka Gakuin, Santo is the grandniece of Kodama Ryōtarō (September 1872 – October 25, 1921), a member of the House of Representatives.

Santo was elected to the House of Councillors for the first time in 1974 after working as an actress and reporter. She was parliamentary vice-minister of environment (Ohira cabinet), and minister of state and director general of the Science and Technology Agency (Kaifu cabinet, 1990–91). She became vice president of the House of Councillors in 2007, and chaired the joint plenary meeting of party members of both houses of the Diet.

The Senkaku episode
Santo played a role in the sale of three of the Senkaku Islands. She had known the landowner (Kurihara family) for 30 years, and in 2011 he told her that he wanted to sell to the governor of Tokyo, Shintaro Ishihara (whose nationalistic book he liked), instead of to the government and the prime minister, Yoshihiko Noda. The latter proposed a land swap, the former cash, and eventually the state bought the land for $25.5 million in 2012.

Like Ishihara, Santo is affiliated to the openly revisionist lobby Nippon Kaigi, which claims Japan's ownership of these islands, which are also claimed by China (as Diaoyu).

References

External links 
  

Government ministers of Japan
Members of the House of Councillors (Japan)
Women government ministers of Japan
Female members of the House of Councillors (Japan)
Japanese actresses
Japanese actor-politicians
Members of Nippon Kaigi
Living people
1942 births
Liberal Democratic Party (Japan) politicians
Presidents of the House of Councillors (Japan)